Dan Empfield (born 1957) is an American entrepreneur in the world of multisport, creator of the triathlon wetsuit in 1987, and the triathlon-specific racing bike in 1989. The original designs were manufactured by the Quintana Roo, which he founded in 1987.

Empfield sold Quintana Roo in 1995 to Saucony and managed that company's bicycle division until June 1999. He left to start Slowtwitch.com.

Today, Empfield is the editor and publisher of the  popular on-line triathlon news and commentary web site slowtwitch.com. His FIST-based protocol of triathlon bicycle fitting is an industry methodology for fitting triathletes to their bikes.

Empfield has been inducted into the Triathlete Magazine Hall of Fame (2004) and the USA Triathlon Hall of Fame (2014), has received the World Open Water Swimming Association's (WOWSA) lifetime achievement award (2010), and was named by Inside Triathlon as one of the ten most influential people in United States triathlon for 2012 and 2013. He received Interbike’s Triathlon Industry Leader of the Year award in 2014. He serves on the board of directors of Triathlon Business International and is a former board member of USA Triathlon.

References

External links
Slowtwitch.com

Living people
1957 births
University of Nevada, Reno alumni
American male triathletes
20th-century American inventors
Inventors from Nevada